Xaichamphon is a district (muang) of Bolikhamsai province in central Laos.

References

Districts of Bolikhamsai province